Events from the year 1677 in Sweden

Incumbents
 Monarch – Charles XI

Events

 31 May–1 June - Battle of Møn
 June 26 - Siege of Malmö
 1–2 July  - Battle of Køge Bay
 July 14 - Battle of Landskrona
 28 August - Battle of Uddevalla
 
 
 
 Tornedalens epos by Antti Keksi is published.

Births

 3 September - Jöran Nordberg, historian (died 1744)

Deaths

 21 January - Christina Anna Skytte, baroness and pirate (died 1643)

References

 
Years of the 17th century in Sweden
Sweden